Home Free is an American country a cappella group of five vocalists: Austin Brown, Rob Lundquist, Adam Rupp, Tim Foust, and Adam Chance. Starting as a show group, they toured with approximately 200 shows a year across the United States. The group won the fourth season of The Sing-Off on NBC in 2013. They sang an arrangement of Hunter Hayes' "I Want Crazy" as their final competitive song, earning the group $100,000 and a recording contract with Sony.

The band released their first major label album, Crazy Life, in February 2014. Their most recent album, So Long Dixie, was released in November 2022.

History 
Home Free was originally formed in January 2001 by Chris Rupp in Mankato, Minnesota, when some of its members were still in their teens. The five founding members were brothers Chris and Adam Rupp, Matt Atwood, Darren Scruggs, and Dan Lemke. They took their name from a boat owned by Atwood's grandfather who helped support the group financially in their early years. The group began as a hobby for the singers, but they gradually grew in experience and popularity. By 2007 they had enough of a following to pursue music full-time. During this period, the Rupp brothers and Atwood formed the core of the group, with Atwood singing lead tenor. Other members of the group came and went. Current member Rob Lundquist, another Minnesotan, joined in 2008.

For much of the group's history they worked with many talented bass singers, but did not have a full-time committed bass voice. In 2007 Chris Foss sang with them. Elliott Robinson was added as bass in September 2008, and was replaced in June 2009 by Troy Horne. Later that year, Horne left to rejoin the House Jacks. To replace Horne they turned to Tim Foust, who first sang with them as a guest on their 2010 tour. A Texas native, Foust was then pursuing a career as a singer/songwriter of country music and had recently released a solo album, but was not ready to sign on full-time. Matthew Tuey sang with the group in the interim of 2011, until Foust joined them full-time in January 2012.

In 2012, Austin Brown was working on a Royal Caribbean cruise ship as a featured singer in their production shows. When Home Free joined the cruise as a guest performing group, they met and became close. Brown, who was born in Tifton, Georgia, let Home Free know that he would be interested in joining the group if they ever had an opening. At the end of 2012 lead singer Matt Atwood and his wife, who had married the previous year, were expecting their first child. Finding the group's touring schedule incompatible with family life, and having an opportunity to take over his family's real estate business in Mankato, Atwood made the decision to retire from the group. Home Free then invited Brown to join as lead tenor. He sang his first show with the group in October 2012, and became full-time in January 2013.

The group, made up of Chris and Adam Rupp, Lundquist, Foust and Brown, competed in the fourth season of The Sing-Off, recording their performances in September 2013. During that time, the group arranged for substitute performers to fulfill their previously-scheduled concert commitments. The series was televised in December 2013, and the group headlined the Sing-Off tour across 32 cities in 2014.

On March 18, 2016, it was announced that, after sixteen years of performing with the group, co-founder Chris Rupp would be leaving to pursue a solo career. He would be replaced after May 8 by Adam Chance, formerly of Street Corner Symphony.

Reception 
An update of Home Free's 2014 album Full of Cheer called Full Of (Even More) Cheer was released in November 2016 and debuted at number two on the Top Country Albums Chart with 13,000 sold - the band's best performance on the chart at the time.

The band has been actively posting videos to their Youtube channel since 2009. In May 2020, they announced that they had reached 1 million subscribers to their channel. Home Free was also an early adopter of Patreon, where they crowdfund to raise money to produce their videos.

Musical background and style 
All five of Home Free's singers have formal musical training. Lundquist and the Rupp brothers all have bachelor's degrees in music. Adam Rupp's primary instrument is trumpet, but he also plays drums, keyboard, and bass guitar. Since joining, Foust and Brown have also become very active in writing and arranging.

In terms of musical roles, Home Free includes a lead tenor (Lundquist), a high tenor (Brown), a baritone (Chance), a bass (Foust), and a beatboxer (Rupp), who provides percussion sounds. Lundquist and Chance sing traditional tenor and baritone harmony, respectively, and Foust sings bass with the range of a basso profundo. Occasionally, the latter two singers switch roles. All of the singers occasionally sing solos supported by the harmonies of the other singers.

Home Free's styling as a country group is relatively recent. Before Foust joined the group, Home Free was an all-purpose a cappella group, singing in a wide variety of styles, of which country was only a minor one. With the additions of Foust and Brown, the group moved more in the direction of country and found that audiences responded well to it. Home Free had auditioned three times for The Sing-Off (without Foust and Brown) and not been accepted. When auditioning for the fourth season, they made a conscious decision to style themselves as a country group. In an interview Brown said this identity is what grabbed the attention of The Sing-Off’s casting director, who said, “You guys really fit something we don’t have.”

Collaborations
Home Free has collaborated with many notable artists. In 2015, they were featured on Kenny Rogers' final album Once Again It's Christmas, performing "Children, Go Where I Send Thee" with Rogers. Also in 2015, the Oak Ridge Boys collaborated with Home Free in a fully a capella version of their song "Elvira".

Don McLean invited them to collaborate on a 50th anniversary recording of his 1971 hit "American Pie". The music video for this performance went on to win three Telly awards in 2021.
Home Free has collaborated on several occasions with fellow a capella artist Peter Hollens on "19 You + Me" in 2014 and the hymn "Amazing Grace" in 2016. In 2020, during the COVID-19 pandemic restrictions, Hollens and Home Free collaborated on a cover of the U2 song "I Still Haven't Found What I'm Looking For", incorporating a choir made up of over 200 members of their respective Patreon patrons; each performer or family group recorded their audio and video remotely.

Also in 2020, Home Free collaborated with Lee Greenwood and the Singing Sergeants of the United States Air Force Band in a recording of Greenwood's hit song "God Bless the U.S.A.". The song was released on June 30, 2020, and reached #1 in digital song sales as of July 18, 2020.

Concert tours 
Before their success on the Sing-Off, Home Free was touring at fairs and festivals across the US, as well as stints on cruise ships. Since then they have been part of the Sing-Off Tour, and headlined their own Crazy Life Tour (2014), Full of Cheer Tour (2014–15), Spring Tour (2015), Don't It Feel Good Tour (2015–16), A Country Christmas Tour (2016), Timeless World Tour (2017–18), and A Country Christmas Tour (2017). In January 2016 they embarked on their first tour outside North America with stops in Birmingham, UK; St. Andrews, Scotland; and London, UK (a planned stop in Dublin, Ireland was canceled due to weather). In September 2016 they had their first concert in Central Europe at the "2nd European Country Festival" in Pertisau, Austria. In September 2019 they began their Dive Bar Saints World Tour, which was postponed due to the ongoing COVID-19 pandemic. In December 2019 they began their Dive Bar Saints Christmas Tour in the US.

On October 8, 2020, the band announced an Indiegogo campaign to fund a virtual holiday concert called "Warmest Winter" to coincide with the release of a new CD of the same name. The campaign met its initial funding goal in nine hours and stretch goals were added for further funding. The pre-filmed concert was streamed from December 2 to 5, 2020, and featured guest appearances by Alabama and The Oak Ridge Boys, among others.

Discography

Albums

Singles

Original songs

Notes

References

External links 
 
 Official Home Free YouTube Channel

2000 establishments in Minnesota
American country music groups
American vocal groups
Musical groups established in 2000
Musical groups from Minnesota
Professional a cappella groups
Vocal quintets